The Robert and Renée Belfer Center for Science and International Affairs, also known as the Belfer Center, is a research center located within the Harvard Kennedy School at Harvard University, in the United States. From 2017 until his death in October, 2022, the center was led by Director Ash Carter, former U.S. Secretary of Defense and Co-Director Eric Rosenbach, former U.S. Assistant Secretary of Defense.

Belfer was founded in 1973 by biochemist Paul M. Doty as the Program for Science and International Affairs within Harvard's Faculty of Arts and Sciences to provide analysis on arms control and nuclear threat reduction.  Following a grant from the Ford Foundation, the program was re-established as the Center for Science and International Affairs, becoming the first permanent research center at the newly formed School of Government. In 1997, following further endowment, the center was renamed as the Robert and Renée Belfer Center for Science and International Affairs in honor of Robert A. Belfer, founder of Belco Oil & Gas Corporation.

In 2012, the Stanton Foundation provided funds for a paid Wikipedian in residence at the Belfer Center. This became controversial due to links between the Belfer Center and the Stanton Foundation (the directors of each are a married couple) and public concerns about conflict-of-interest editing on Wikipedia. The center is organized into subgroups with specific areas of focus; for example, an energy technology innovation policy group led by Laura Diaz Anadon.

A 2021 investigative report by student group Fossil Fuel Divest Harvard found that many of the center's climate initiatives were funded in part by fossil fuel companies, and that the center had allegedly taken several steps to cover up that fact.

Board members 
Center board members include:
 Graham Allison, former Director, Belfer Center, Douglas Dillon Professor of Government, Harvard Kennedy School
 Lewis M. Branscomb, Professor emeritus of Public Policy and Corporate Management
 Albert Carnesale, former Harvard University provost
 Ashton B. Carter, Chair of International Relations, Security & Science faculty, physicist, who served as the 25th United States Secretary of Defense (until his death  in October 2022)
 John M. Deutch, former Director of Central Intelligence
 John P. Holdren, John Heinz Professor of Environmental Policy
 Joseph Nye, University Distinguished Service Professor

Advisory board 
The center has an international advisory board.  Members include:
 Michael Chertoff, former U.S. Secretary of Homeland Security
 Gregory C. Carr, Boston Technology founder
 Tim Collins, Ripplewood Holdings founder
 Chuck Robbins, CEO of Cisco Systems
 Nathaniel Rothschild, Atticus Capital co-chairman

Past members 
 Stephen Biddle, theorist setting U.S. counterinsurgency policy
 Pierpaolo Barbieri, author, founder of Ualá
 Paul Volcker, former United States Chairman of the Federal Reserve

References

External links
Official website

Harvard Kennedy School
1973 establishments in Massachusetts
Realist think tanks